John Sebastion Grogan (September 24, 1880 – October 22, 1952) was an American football, basketball, and baseball player and coach. He played college football at Knox College in Galesburg, Illinois from 1900 to 1903, where he dropkicked a 55-yard field goal in an upset win over the Illinois Fighting Illini. Grogan served as the head football, basketball and baseball coach at the University of Idaho in Moscow, Idaho during the 1909–10 academic year.

Head coaching record

Football

References

External links
 

1880 births
1952 deaths
Basketball coaches from Illinois
Idaho Vandals baseball coaches
Idaho Vandals football coaches
Idaho Vandals men's basketball coaches
Knox Prairie Fire football players
People from Streator, Illinois
Players of American football from Illinois